Frank Haydock (born 29 November 1940) is an English former footballer who played at centre-half for several clubs, including Manchester United, Charlton Athletic and Portsmouth. His brother, Billy, was also a professional footballer who played for Manchester City, Crewe Alexandra and Stockport County.

Career
Born in Eccles, Lancashire, Haydock began his football career as an amateur with Blackpool in 1956. A year later, he signed amateur forms with Manchester United, before turning professional in December 1959. He made his Manchester United debut on 20 August 1960, playing at centre half in a 3–1 home defeat to Blackburn Rovers. He also played in the same position in the next three matches, before the number 5 jersey was usurped, first by Ronnie Cope and then Bill Foulkes, a convert from right-back. It was more than a year before Haydock returned to the United first team, filling in for Foulkes for a home game against Birmingham City on 14 October 1961. He only made one more appearances for the first team after that, a 3–2 away defeat to Nottingham Forest on the final day of the 1962–63 Football League season.

Haydock was sold to Charlton Athletic for £10,000 in August 1963. He played for Charlton for two-and-a-half years, making 84 appearances and scoring four goals before a transfer to Portsmouth in December 1965. In a Portsmouth career spanning just over three years, Haydock made 72 appearances and scored one goal. He was then transferred to Southend United in February 1969, spending a year there. He moved to Northern Premier League club Fleetwood in 1972, initially as a player before becoming player-manager, remaining there until the club folded in 1976.

External links
Profile at Neil Brown's Post-War Football League Players Database
Profile at StretfordEnd.co.uk
Profile at MUFCInfo.com

1940 births
Living people
People from Eccles, Greater Manchester
English footballers
Blackpool F.C. players
Fleetwood Town F.C. players
Manchester United F.C. players
Charlton Athletic F.C. players
Portsmouth F.C. players
Southend United F.C. players
English Football League players
Association football defenders